Robert Lee McNealy (born August 12, 1958) is a former Major League Baseball outfielder who made a brief appearance with the Oakland Athletics toward the end of the  season.

While playing college baseball for Florida International University, McNealy was drafted by the New York Yankees in the fourth round of the January  amateur draft, but did not sign. His stock fell by his senior year, as the Seattle Mariners waited until the seventeenth round of the 1980 Major League Baseball Draft to call his name.

He batted .306 with three home runs, sixty runs batted in, 124 runs scored and 73 stolen bases in his two seasons in Seattle's farm system. On December 9, he and fellow minor leaguer Tim Hallgren were traded to Oakland for pitcher Roy Thomas.

In his first season with the A's, he batted .310 and scored eighty runs for the double A West Haven A's to be voted the sixth best prospect in the Eastern League in a  poll of the league's managers. A's manager Steve Boros used McNealy mostly as a pinch runner in the fifteen games in which he appeared. McNealy logged just four plate appearances without getting a hit, but still managed to score five runs. On September 27, 1983, he scored the game winning run of their 5-4 victory over the Chicago White Sox pinch running for Jeff Burroughs.

On December 7, 1983, he was traded to the Montreal Expos for veteran pitcher Ray Burris.

References

External links

Major League Baseball center fielders
Oakland Athletics players
Baseball players from Sacramento, California
1958 births
Living people
FIU Panthers baseball players
Bellingham Mariners players
San Jose Missions players
West Haven A's players
Tacoma Tigers players
Jacksonville Suns players
Chattanooga Lookouts players
San Jose Bees players
Southern Idaho Golden Eagles baseball players